Noblestown is a census-designated place (CDP) in Allegheny County, Pennsylvania, United States.  The community was part of the Sturgeon-Noblestown CDP before later splitting into two separate CDPs in 2010, becoming Sturgeon and Noblestown.  The population of Noblestown was 797 at the 2020 census.

Geography
Noblestown is located at  (40.3955, -80.2019).

Demographics

References

Census-designated places in Allegheny County, Pennsylvania
Pittsburgh metropolitan area
Census-designated places in Pennsylvania